Top7 is an artificial 93-residue protein, classified as a de novo protein since it was designed by Brian Kuhlman and Gautam Dantas in David Baker's laboratory at the University of Washington to have a unique fold not found in nature. The protein was designed ab initio on a computer with the help of protein structure prediction algorithms. Determination of the high-resolution X-ray structure of the experimentally expressed and purified protein revealed that the structure (PDB ID: 1QYS) was indeed very similar (1.2 Å RMSD) to the computer-designed model. The structure consists of two alpha helices packed on a five-stranded anti-parallel beta sheet.

Top7 was featured as the RCSB Protein Data Bank's 'Molecule of the Month' in October 2005, and a superposition of the respective cores (residues 60-79) of its predicted and X-ray crystal structures are featured in the Rosetta@home logo.

References

Engineered proteins
Protein structure